Paul G. Ruggiers (April 29, 1918 – April 8, 1998) was an American literary historian.

He was the David Ross Boyd Professor (1964), George Lynn Cross Professor (1972), and Distinguished Professor of Humanities (1979) at the University of Oklahoma.

References

1918 births
1998 deaths
University of Oklahoma faculty
20th-century American historians
American male non-fiction writers
Washington & Jefferson College alumni
20th-century American male writers